Park Chan-yeol (born November 27, 1992), better known mononymously as Chanyeol, is a South Korean rapper,  singer, songwriter, producer, actor and model. He is a member of the South Korean-Chinese boy group Exo, its sub-group Exo-K and sub-unit Exo-SC. Apart from his group's activities, Chanyeol has also starred in various television dramas and movies such as So I Married an Anti-fan (2016), and Secret Queen Makers (2018).

Early life
Park Chanyeol was born in Seoul, South Korea. He attended Hyundai High School in Apgujeong-dong, Seoul. He has an elder sister named Park Yoo-ra, who is a former announcer at South Korean broadcasting station YTN, and MBC. Chanyeol was admitted to a private acting institution when he was sixteen years old, where he became good friends with Block B's P.O.

After watching School of Rock in elementary school, Chanyeol became interested in music and soon began playing the drums. Chanyeol wanted to be a singer after listening to Unconditional Kismet by Yoo Young-jin.

Chanyeol has cited Jason Mraz and Eminem as his biggest influences, though he was a fan of rock bands like Muse, Green Day, Nirvana, and X-Japan in middle school.

Chanyeol became a trainee under SM Entertainment after winning second place in the 2008 Smart Model Contest. While training under S.M., he began to turn his focus towards rapping. Prior to his debut, Chanyeol made cameo appearances in TVXQ's "HaHaHa Song" music video and Girls' Generation's "Genie" music video in 2008 and 2010 respectively.

Career

2012–14: Career beginnings

Chanyeol became the last Exo member to be officially introduced to the public on February 23, 2012. He possesses a baritone singing voice. The group official debuted on April 8 with the extended play Mama. He made a guest appearance in Girls' Generation-TTS's music video for their debut single "Twinkle". In October 2013, Chanyeol joined the cast of SBS' reality TV show Law of the Jungle during its filming in Micronesia. He also composed and recorded an original soundtrack titled "Last Hunter" for the show in 2015 after rejoining the show.

In 2014, Chanyeol wrote the rap for the Korean version of the track "Run" from Exo's second extended play Overdose and was featured in label-mates Henry's second extended play and Zhou Mi's debut EP. In May 2014, he became a regular cast member of the first season of SBS' reality TV show Roommate. He left the show in September 2014 due to schedule conflicts.

2015–present: Acting, songwriting and Exo-SC

In April 2015, Chanyeol made his big screen debut with a supporting role in the South Korean film Salut d'Amour, which starred Park Geun-hyung and Youn Yuh-jung. He later starred as the male lead alongside actress Moon Ga-young and fellow Exo members in the web-drama Exo Next Door. In June 2015, Chanyeol, along with fellow Exo members Chen and Lay, co-wrote the Korean version of the track "Promise" from Love Me Right, the re-released version of Exo's second studio album. He later wrote the rap for "Lightsaber", Exo's promotional single for Star Wars: The Force Awakens, which was subsequently included in their third extended play Sing for You.

In April 2016, Chanyeol wrote and performed the rap for the song "Confession" from Yesung's debut extended play. In Exo's third studio album Ex'Act, which was released in May 2016, he co-wrote the lyrics for the track "Heaven". In June 2016, Chanyeol starred alongside Yuan Shanshan and label-mate Seohyun in the South Korean-Chinese film So I Married an Anti-fan. He and Yuan Shanshan also recorded a duet titled "I Hate You" as the theme song for the movie. In October 2016, Chanyeol and American R&B singer Tinashe were featured in American hip hop group Far East Movement and American electronic musician Marshmello's song "Freal Luv". In December 2016, Chanyeol and South Korean singer Punch collaborated on an original soundtrack titled "Stay With Me" for tvN's drama Guardian: The Lonely and Great God. The song reached number three on South Korea's Gaon Digital Chart.

In January 2017, Chanyeol played a supporting role in MBC's drama Missing 9. In February 2017, it was reported that he had allegedly registered himself as a music producer under the pen name "LOEY" with the Korea Music Copyright Association. Later in February, Chanyeol collaborated with South Korean singer Junggigo on a duet titled "Let Me Love You".

In May 2018, it was announced that Chanyeol would be playing the supporting role of Jung Se-joo, Hee-joo's younger brother in tvN's drama Memories of the Alhambra.

On September 14, 2018, Chanyeol with fellow Exo member Sehun released a collaborative single, "We Young", for SM Station X 0.

On April 25, 2019, he released his first solo song "SSFW" through SM Station. On June 28, it was confirmed that Chanyeol along with his fellow Exo member Sehun would debut as the group's second official sub-unit Exo-SC, and they released their first EP What a Life on July 22, 2019.

In 2021, he appeared in musical road film The Box, a jukebox musical containing familiar popular songs from world music as; Coldplay, Billie Eilish, and Pharrell Williams in the backdrop of South Korean locales.

Personal life
Along with fellow Exo members Suho and Baekhyun, Chanyeol attended Kyung Hee Cyber University and took online classes for Culture and Arts Department of Business Administration. Prior to his enlistment, Chanyeol took graduate studies at Inha University for interior design.

Chanyeol enlisted into the military as an active duty soldier on March 29, 2021. He was finally discharged on September 28, 2022.

Discography

Songs

Notes

Songwriting credits
All credits are adapted from the Korea Music Copyright Association, unless stated otherwise.

Filmography

Films

Television dramas

Television shows

Music videos

Theater

Ambassadorship

Awards and nominations

Notes

References

External links

 
 
 
 

1992 births
Living people
21st-century South Korean singers
Exo members
Mandarin-language singers of South Korea
Singers from Seoul
South Korean contemporary R&B singers
South Korean dance music singers
South Korean electronic music singers
South Korean male rappers
South Korean male idols
South Korean pop rock singers
South Korean male film actors
South Korean male television actors
South Korean male web series actors
South Korean mandopop singers
South Korean male pop singers
South Korean singer-songwriters
South Korean male singer-songwriters
South Korean baritones